Leah Kirchmann (born 30 June 1990) is a Canadian racing cyclist, who rides for National Cycling League team Denver Disruptors. She competed in the 2013 UCI women's road race in Florence. At the 2014 Global Relay Canadian Road Championships, held in Lac-Mégantic, Quebec, she won the road race, time trial and the criterium, becoming the first woman to win all three titles in the same year.

Career
Kirchmann's first sport was cross-country skiing. She continued to compete as a skier until about the age of 18. Kirchmann originally started mountain biking as summer training for ski racing. She turned professional in 2011 with the  team. When the team dissolved at the end of 2011, Kirchmann followed director Rachel Heal to the new  team in 2012.

In June 2016, she was officially named in Canada's 2016 Olympic team. She also qualified to represent Canada at the 2020 Summer Olympics.

In August 2022, Kirchmann announced that she would retire from professional cycling at the end of the 2022 season. However, in December 2022, it was announced that Kirchmann would form part of the roster for the Denver Disruptors, for the inaugural season of the National Cycling League in 2023.

Major results
Source: 

2006
 1st  Cross-country, National Junior Mountain Bike Championships
2009
 1st  Criterium, Canada Summer Games
2010
 National Road Championships
1st  Criterium
1st  Under-23 road race
 6th Grand Prix Cycliste de Gatineau
2011
 1st  Criterium, National Road Championships
 1st  Overall Tour of Elk Grove
 Nature Valley Grand Prix
1st Mountains classification
1st Sprints classification
1st Stage 5
 4th Grand Prix Cycliste de Gatineau
 10th Road race, Pan American Road Championships
2012
 1st  Sprints classification, Energiewacht Tour
 2nd  Road race, Pan American Road Championships
 4th Liberty Classic
 9th Overall Tour Cycliste Féminin International de l'Ardèche
1st  Young rider classification
2013
 National Road Championships
1st  Criterium
2nd Road race
 1st White Spot / Delta Road Race
2014
 National Road Championships
1st  Time trial
1st  Road race
1st  Criterium
 1st White Spot / Delta Road Race
 San Dimas Stage Race
1st Sprints classification
1st Young rider classification
1st Stage 3
 2nd Chrono Gatineau
 3rd Overall Redlands Bicycle Classic
1st  Points classification
1st Stages 3 & 4
 3rd La Course by Le Tour de France
 4th EPZ Omloop van Borsele
 6th Overall BeNe Ladies Tour
 7th Grand Prix cycliste de Gatineau
 8th Road race, Commonwealth Games
2015
 National Road Championships
2nd Road race
3rd Time trial
3rd Criterium
 2nd Overall Tour of California
1st  Points classification
1st Stages 2 & 3
 2nd White Spot / Delta Road Race
 4th Overall Joe Martin Stage Race
1st Stage 2
 6th Grand Prix cycliste de Gatineau
 7th Overall San Dimas Stage Race
 7th Overall The Women's Tour
 7th Philadelphia Cycling Classic
 8th Overall Tour of the Gila
2016
 1st Drentse Acht van Westerveld
 2nd Omloop van het Hageland
 3rd Road race, National Road Championships
 3rd Overall Tour of Chongming Island
 3rd Grand Prix Cycliste de Gatineau
 3rd RideLondon Grand Prix
 4th Omloop Het Nieuwsblad
 6th Overall The Women's Tour
 6th Chrono Gatineau
 6th GP de Plouay
 7th Gent–Wevelgem
 8th Overall Giro d'Italia Femminile
1st Prologue
 10th Overall Holland Ladies Tour
 10th Strade Bianche
 10th Ronde van Drenthe
2017
 1st  Team time trial, UCI Road World Championships
 1st Grand Prix Cycliste de Gatineau
 2nd Time trial, National Road Championships
 3rd Crescent Vårgårda UCI Women's WorldTour
 4th Overall The Women's Tour
 4th White Spot / Delta Road Race
 9th Chrono Gatineau
 9th Madrid Challenge by La Vuelta
2018
 National Road Championships
1st  Time trial
5th Road race
 1st Team time trial, Ladies Tour of Norway
 1st Stage 1 (TTT) Giro Rosa
 2nd Brabantse Pijl
 2nd Crescent Vårgårda TTT
 UCI Road World Championships
3rd  Team time trial
4th Time trial
 4th Overall Madrid Challenge by La Vuelta
1st Stage 1 (TTT)
 5th Overall Holland Ladies Tour
2019
 National Road Championships
1st  Time trial
2nd Road race
 1st Grand Prix Cycliste de Gatineau
 2nd Chrono Gatineau
 2nd La Course by Le Tour de France
 3rd Overall Ladies Tour of Norway
 3rd Omloop van het Hageland
 3rd Postnord UCI WWT Vårgårda West Sweden TTT
 6th Overall The Women's Tour
 8th Brabantse Pijl
 10th Postnord UCI WWT Vårgårda West Sweden
2020
 5th Overall Challenge by La Vuelta
 5th Cadel Evans Great Ocean Road Race
 6th Overall Women's Tour Down Under
1st  Sprints classification
 9th Race Torquay
2021
 2nd Overall Festival Elsy Jacobs
 6th Overall The Women's Tour
2022
 3rd Time trial, National Road Championships

References

External links
 
 
 
 
 
 
 
 
 

1990 births
Living people
Canadian female cyclists
Sportspeople from Winnipeg
Cyclists at the 2014 Commonwealth Games
Cyclists at the 2022 Commonwealth Games
Commonwealth Games competitors for Canada
Cyclists at the 2016 Summer Olympics
Cyclists at the 2020 Summer Olympics
Olympic cyclists of Canada
20th-century Canadian women
21st-century Canadian women